The 2021 European Amateur Team Championship took place 6–10 July at PGA Catalunya in Spain. It was the 38th men's golf European Amateur Team Championship. The event was originally intended to be played at Vasatorp Golf Club in Sweden but was moved because of travel restriction concerns.

Format 
Each team consisted of six players. On the first two days each player played 18 holes of stroke play each day. The lowest five scores from each team’s six players counted to the team total each day.

The eight best teams formed flight A, in knock-out match-play over the following three days. The teams were seeded based on their positions after the stroke play. The first placed team was drawn to play the quarter final against the eight placed team, the second against the seventh, the third against the sixth and the fourth against the fifth. Teams were allowed to use six players during the team matches, selecting four of them in the two morning foursome games and five players in to the afternoon single games. Teams knocked out after the quarter finals played one foursome game and four single games in each of their remaining matches. Extra holes were played in games that were all square after 18 holes. However, if the result of the team match was already decided, games were declared halved.

The teams outside the top eight in the stroke-play stage formed flight B, also played knock-out match-play, but with one foursome game and four single games in each match, to decide their final positions.

The three last placed nation teams are normally moved to the Division 2 championship for next year. However, because of the reduced format of the championship due to COVID 19-restrictions, no nations were relegated.

Teams 
13 national teams contested the event. England, Scotland and Wales did not compete.

Winners 
Host nation Spain led the opening 36-hole stroke-play competition with a 17-under-par score of 693, four strokes ahead of Sweden with defending champion team Germany in third place a further four strokes behind.

There was no official award for the lowest individual score, but individual leader was Eugenio López-Chacarra, Spain, with a 9-under-par score of 133, one stroke ahead of Pontus Nyholm, Sweden and Jean de Wouters d'Oplinter, Belgium.

Team Denmark won the gold medal, earning their first title, beating team France in the final 5–1.

Team Belgium earned the bronze on third place, after beating Spain 6–1 in the bronze match.

Results 
Qualification round

Team standings

* Note: In the event of a tie the order was determined by the best total of the two non-counting scores of the two rounds.

Individual leaders

Note: There was no official award for the lowest individual score.

Flight A

Bracket

Final games

* Note: Game declared halved, since team match already decided.

Flight B

Bracket

Final standings

Source:

References

External links 
European Golf Association: Full results

European Amateur Team Championship
Golf tournaments in Spain
European Amateur Team Championship
European Amateur Team Championship
European Amateur Team Championship